Kevin McDugle (born May 3, 1967) is an American politician who has served in the Oklahoma House of Representatives from the 12th district since 2016. Following the serious injury of people blocking a road at a Black Lives Matter protest in 2020, McDugle authored a bill that would grant immunity to drivers engaging in vehicle-ramming attacks.

References

1967 births
Living people
Republican Party members of the Oklahoma House of Representatives
21st-century American politicians